A manikin (or mannequin) is a life-sized human doll used especially in sales.

Manikin and mannikin may also refer to:

 Transparent Anatomical Manikin, a life-sized human doll used in medical education
 Lonchura, a genus of bird which includes mannikins (not to be confused with manakins)
 Manikin (comics), a Marvel Comics character
 Mannikin, a type of elf or goblin: 
 The black mannikin of The King of the Golden Mountain
 Heinzelmännchen, the 'little-Harry mannikin'
 Manikin, an enemy type from the video game, Dissidia Final Fantasy
 Manikin, a human-like race from the video game, Shin Megami Tensei: Nocturne

See also
Mannequin (disambiguation)
Manakin, a bird